The Mayotte white-eye or chestnut-sided white-eye (Zosterops mayottensis) is a species of bird in the family Zosteropidae. It is now found only on Mayotte in the Comoro Islands. Its natural habitats are subtropical or tropical dry forests, subtropical or tropical moist lowland forests, and subtropical or tropical mangrove forests.

The Marianne white-eye formerly considered as subspecies of Mayotte white-eye occurred on Marianne and perhaps other islands in the Seychelles but is now extinct.

References

Further reading

Skerrett, Adrian; Bullock, Ian & Disley, Tony (2001) Birds of Seychelles, Christopher Helm, London.

Birds described in 1866
Birds of Mayotte
Zosterops
Taxonomy articles created by Polbot
Endemic fauna of Mayotte